Ryan Junge (born September 7, 1984 in Omaha, Nebraska) is a retired American soccer player who last played for the Missouri Comets of the MISL.

Junge played one year of collegiate soccer at Hastings College before transferring to Creighton University.  He started 79 of 83 games, where he scored 8 goals and assisted on 14 more. He was 2 time all conference, 1st team all region and strength and conditioning All American while at Creighton. 

He was drafted in the MLS's second round, 15th overall, by the Columbus Crew in the 2007 MLS Supplemental Draft and appeared in 13 matches, 3 of them starts in three seasons with the Black & Gold. Junge was a part of the team that won the 2008 MLS Championship.

In September 2010, Junge signed with the Omaha Vipers of the MISL. Junge led all rookies in scoring with 21pts. He was named to the 2010-2011 All MISL Rookie team.

External links
 Profile at MLSNet

1984 births
Living people
American soccer players
Creighton Bluejays men's soccer players
Cleveland City Stars players
Columbus Crew players
Missouri Comets players
Sportspeople from Omaha, Nebraska
Hastings College alumni
USL Second Division players
Major League Soccer players
Major Indoor Soccer League (2008–2014) players
Columbus Crew draft picks
Soccer players from Nebraska
Association football defenders